The following outline is provided as an overview of and topical guide to Ukraine:

Ukraine – country in Eastern Europe. Formerly part of the Soviet Union. Ukraine has long been a global breadbasket because of its extensive, fertile farmlands. In 2011, it was the world's third-largest grain exporter with that year's harvest being much larger than average.

General reference 

 Pronunciation:  
 Common English country name:  Ukraine
 Official English country name:  Ukraine
 Common endonym(s): Україна Ukraina
 Official endonym(s): Україна Ukraina
 Adjectival(s): Ukrainian
 Demonym(s): Ukrainians
 Etymology: Name of Ukraine
 International rankings of Ukraine
 ISO country codes:  UA, UKR, 804
 ISO region codes:  See ISO 3166-2:UA
 Internet country code top-level domain:  .ua

Geography of Ukraine 

Geography of Ukraine
Ukraine is located in the south-east part of Europe. The capital city of Ukraine is Kyiv, located in north-central Ukraine. The country is bordered by the Black Sea and the Sea of Azov and the country of Russia and Belarus.
 Ukraine is: a country
 Location:
 Northern Hemisphere and Eastern Hemisphere
 Eurasia
 Europe
 Eastern Europe
 Time zone:  Eastern European Time (UTC+02), Eastern European Summer Time (UTC+03)
 Extreme points of Ukraine
 High:  Hora Hoverla 
 Low:  Black Sea 0 m
 Land boundaries:  4,566 km
 1,576 km
 940 km
 891 km
 538 km
 428 km
 103 km
 90 km
 Coastline:  Black Sea 2,782 km
 Population of Ukraine: 46,191,022 (September 1, 2008)  – 27th most populous country

 Area of Ukraine: 603,628 km2
 Atlas of Ukraine

Environment of Ukraine 

 Climate of Ukraine
 Renewable energy in Ukraine
 Geology of Ukraine
 Protected areas of Ukraine
 Biosphere reserves in Ukraine
 National parks of Ukraine
 Wildlife of Ukraine
 Fauna of Ukraine
 Birds of Ukraine
 Mammals of Ukraine

Natural geographic features of Ukraine 
 Glaciers of Ukraine
 Islands of Ukraine
 Lakes of Ukraine
 Mountains of Ukraine
 Volcanoes in Ukraine
 Rivers of Ukraine
 Waterfalls of Ukraine
 Valleys of Ukraine
 World Heritage Sites in Ukraine

Regions of Ukraine 

Regions of Ukraine

Ecoregions of Ukraine 

List of ecoregions in Ukraine
 Ecoregions in Ukraine

Administrative divisions of Ukraine 

Administrative divisions of Ukraine
 Provinces of Ukraine
 Districts of Ukraine
 Municipalities of Ukraine

Provinces of Ukraine 

Provinces of Ukraine

Districts of Ukraine 

Districts of Ukraine

Municipalities of Ukraine 

Municipalities of Ukraine
 Capital of Ukraine: Kyiv
 Cities of Ukraine

Demography of Ukraine 

Demographics of Ukraine

Government and politics of Ukraine 

Politics of Ukraine
 Form of government: unitary semi-presidential representative democratic republic
 Capital of Ukraine: Kyiv
 Elections in Ukraine
 Political parties in Ukraine
 2007 Ukrainian political crisis, 2008 Ukrainian political crisis

Branches of the government of Ukraine 

Government of Ukraine

Executive branch of the government of Ukraine 
 Head of state: President of Ukraine, Volodymyr Zelenskyy
 Head of government: Prime Minister of Ukraine, Denys Shmyhal
 Speaker of the Parliament: Ruslan Stefanchuk
 Cabinet of Ministers of Ukraine

Legislative branch of the government of Ukraine 

 Parliament of Ukraine (unicameral)
 Verkhovna Rada of Ukraine

Judicial branch of the government of Ukraine 

The judicial system of Ukraine consists of four levels of courts of general jurisdiction:

Level 4 – Supreme Court of Ukraine 
Supreme Court of Ukraine – the court of final appeal, covers all cases

Level 3 – High administrative courts 
High courts with specialized jurisdiction
 The High Administrative Court of Ukraine – covers administrative cases
 The High Arbitration Court of Ukraine – covers economic and commercial cases

Level 2 – Appeals Courts 
Appeals courts of Ukraine
 Appeals Court of the Autonomous Republic of Crimea
 Regional appeals courts of Ukraine
 Appeals courts of the cities of Kyiv and Sevastopol
 Appeals Court of the Ukrainian Navy
 Regional military appeals courts of Ukraine
 Economic appeals courts of Ukraine (known also as arbitration courts)
 Administrative appeals courts of Ukraine
 The Appeals Court of Ukraine – currently does not exist

Level 1 – Local courts of general jurisdiction 
Local courts of general jurisdiction of Ukraine – includes criminal and civil jurisdiction
 District, urban district and town courts of Ukraine
 Regional courts of Ukraine
 City courts in Kyiv and Sevastopol
 Administrative local courts of Ukraine

Foreign relations of Ukraine 

Foreign relations of Ukraine
 Diplomatic missions in Ukraine
 Diplomatic missions of Ukraine

International organization membership 

International organization membership of Ukraine
Ukraine is a member of:

Australia Group
Black Sea Economic Cooperation Zone (BSEC)
Central European Initiative (CEI)
Commonwealth of Independent States (CIS)
Council of Europe (CE)
Council of the Baltic Sea States (CBSS) (observer)
Eurasian Economic Community (EAEC) (observer)
Euro-Atlantic Partnership Council (EAPC)
European Bank for Reconstruction and Development (EBRD)
Food and Agriculture Organization (FAO)
General Confederation of Trade Unions (GCTU)
International Atomic Energy Agency (IAEA)
International Bank for Reconstruction and Development (IBRD)
International Chamber of Commerce (ICC)
International Civil Aviation Organization (ICAO)
International Criminal Court (ICCt) (signatory)
International Criminal Police Organization (Interpol)
International Development Association (IDA)
International Federation of Red Cross and Red Crescent Societies (IFRCS)
International Finance Corporation (IFC)
International Hydrographic Organization (IHO)
International Labour Organization (ILO)
International Maritime Organization (IMO)
International Mobile Satellite Organization (IMSO)
International Monetary Fund (IMF)
International Olympic Committee (IOC)
International Organization for Migration (IOM)
International Organization for Standardization (ISO)
International Red Cross and Red Crescent Movement (ICRM)
International Telecommunication Union (ITU)
International Telecommunications Satellite Organization (ITSO)

Inter-Parliamentary Union (IPU)
Latin American Integration Association (LAIA) (observer)
Multilateral Investment Guarantee Agency (MIGA)
Nonaligned Movement (NAM) (observer)
Nuclear Suppliers Group (NSG)
Organisation internationale de la Francophonie (OIF) (observer)
Organization for Democracy and Economic Development (GUAM)
Organization for Security and Cooperation in Europe (OSCE)
Organisation for the Prohibition of Chemical Weapons (OPCW)
Organization of American States (OAS) (observer)
Partnership for Peace (PFP)
Permanent Court of Arbitration (PCA)
Southeast European Cooperative Initiative (SECI) (observer)
United Nations (UN)
United Nations Conference on Trade and Development (UNCTAD)
United Nations Educational, Scientific, and Cultural Organization (UNESCO)
United Nations Industrial Development Organization (UNIDO)
United Nations Mission in Liberia (UNMIL)
United Nations Mission in the Sudan (UNMIS)
United Nations Observer Mission in Georgia (UNOMIG)
United Nations Organization Mission in the Democratic Republic of the Congo (MONUC)
Universal Postal Union (UPU)
World Confederation of Labour (WCL)
World Customs Organization (WCO)
World Federation of Trade Unions (WFTU)
World Health Organization (WHO)
World Intellectual Property Organization (WIPO)
World Meteorological Organization (WMO)
World Tourism Organization (UNWTO)
World Trade Organization (WTO)
World Veterans Federation
Zangger Committee (ZC)

Law and order in Ukraine 

Law of Ukraine
 Constitution of Ukraine
 Crime in Ukraine
 Human rights in Ukraine
 LGBT rights in Ukraine
 Freedom of religion in Ukraine
 Law enforcement in Ukraine

Military of Ukraine 

Military of Ukraine
 Command
 Commander-in-chief: Volodymyr Zelenskyy
 Ministry of Defence of Ukraine
 Forces
 Army of Ukraine
 Navy of Ukraine
 Air Force of Ukraine
 Special forces of Ukraine
 Military history of Ukraine
 Military ranks of Ukraine

Local government in Ukraine 

Local government in Ukraine

History of Ukraine 

History of Ukraine
 Timeline of the history of Ukraine
 Bibliography of Ukrainian history

History of Ukraine, by period

Modern history of Ukraine 
Modern history of Ukraine
 Russo-Ukrainian War (outline) (2014-present)
 Annexation of Crimea by the Russian Federation (2014)
 Timeline of the annexation of Crimea by the Russian Federation
 2014 Crimean status referendum
 War in Donbas
 Timeline of the war in Donbas
 2022 Russian invasion of Ukraine
 Timeline of the 2022 Russian invasion of Ukraine
 2022 Russian invasion of Ukraine reactions
 Allegations of child abductions in the 2022 Russian invasion of Ukraine
 Allegations of genocide of Ukrainians in the 2022 Russian invasion of Ukraine
 Anonymous and the 2022 Russian invasion of Ukraine
 Attacks on civilians in the 2022 Russian invasion of Ukraine
 Belarusian involvement in the 2022 Russian invasion of Ukraine
 Chechen involvement in the 2022 Russian invasion of Ukraine
 China and the 2022 Russian invasion of Ukraine
 Collaboration with Russia during the 2022 Russian invasion of Ukraine
 Corporate responses to the 2022 Russian invasion of Ukraine
 Economic impact of the 2022 Russian invasion of Ukraine
 Environmental impact of the 2022 Russian invasion of Ukraine
 Fundraising for Ukraine during the 2022 Russian invasion of Ukraine
 Government and intergovernmental reactions to the 2022 Russian invasion of Ukraine
 Humanitarian impact of the 2022 Russian invasion of Ukraine
 Impact of the 2022 Russian invasion of Ukraine on nuclear power plants
 International sanctions during the 2022 Russian invasion of Ukraine
 Legality of the 2022 Russian invasion of Ukraine
 List of damaged cultural sites during the 2022 Russian invasion of Ukraine
 List of military engagements during the 2022 Russian invasion of Ukraine
 List of monuments and memorials removed following the Russian invasion of Ukraine
 List of streets renamed due to the 2022 Russian invasion of Ukraine
 Non-government reactions to the 2022 Russian invasion of Ukraine
 Nuclear threats during the 2022 Russian invasion of Ukraine
 Open-source intelligence in the 2022 Russian invasion of Ukraine
 Order of battle for the 2022 Russian invasion of Ukraine
 Prelude to the 2022 Russian invasion of Ukraine
 Proposed no-fly zone in the 2022 Russian invasion of Ukraine
 Protests against the 2022 Russian invasion of Ukraine
 Sexual violence in the 2022 Russian invasion of Ukraine
 Speeches by Volodymyr Zelenskyy during the 2022 Russian invasion of Ukraine
 Statements of the Riigikogu 2022 on the Russian invasion of Ukraine
 Ukrainian resistance during the 2022 Russian invasion of Ukraine
 United States and the 2022 Russian invasion of Ukraine
 Use of white phosphorus bombs in the 2022 Russian invasion of Ukraine
 War crimes in the 2022 Russian invasion of Ukraine
 Wikipedia and the 2022 Russian invasion of Ukraine
 Women in the 2022 Russian invasion of Ukraine
 Yachts impacted by international sanctions following the Russian invasion of Ukraine

History of Ukraine, by region 

 History of Crimea
 History of Kyiv
 History of Sevastopol

History of Ukraine's oblasts 

 History of Cherkasy Oblast
 History of Chernihiv Oblast
 History of Chernivtsi Oblast
 History of Dnipropetrovsk Oblast
 History of Donetsk Oblast
 History of Ivano-Frankivsk Oblast
 History of Kharkiv Oblast
 History of Kherson Oblast
 History of Khmelnytskyi Oblast
 History of Kyiv Oblast
 History of Kirovohrad Oblast
 History of Luhansk Oblast
 History of Lviv Oblast
 History of Mykolaiv Oblast
 History of Odesa Oblast
 History of Poltava Oblast
 History of Rivne Oblast
 History of Sumy Oblast
 History of Ternopil Oblast
 History of Vinnytsia Oblast
 History of Volyn Oblast
 History of Zakarpattia Oblast
 History of Zaporizhzhia Oblast
 History of Zhytomyr Oblast

History of Ukraine, by subject 
 Military history of Ukraine

Ukrainian people

Ukrainian people stubs

Culture of Ukraine 

Culture of Ukraine
 Architecture of Ukraine
Ukrainian Baroque
 Cuisine of Ukraine
 Festivals in Ukraine
 Languages of Ukraine
 Media in Ukraine
 Museums in Ukraine
 National symbols of Ukraine
 Coat of arms of Ukraine
 Flag of Ukraine
 National anthem of Ukraine
 People of Ukraine
 Prostitution in Ukraine
 Public holidays in Ukraine
 Records of Ukraine
 Religion in Ukraine
 Buddhism in Ukraine
 Christianity in Ukraine
 Hinduism in Ukraine
 Islam in Ukraine
 Judaism in Ukraine
 Sikhism in Ukraine
 World Heritage Sites in Ukraine

Art in Ukraine 
 Art in Ukraine
 Cinema of Ukraine
 Ukrainian dance
 Literature of Ukraine
 Music of Ukraine
 Television in Ukraine
 Theatre in Ukraine

Sports in Ukraine 

Sports in Ukraine
 Football in Ukraine
 Ukraine at the Olympics

Economy and infrastructure of Ukraine 

Economy of Ukraine
 Economic rank, by nominal GDP (2007): 48th (forty-eighth)
 Agriculture in Ukraine
 Banking in Ukraine
 National Bank of Ukraine
 Communications in Ukraine
 Internet in Ukraine
 Companies of Ukraine
Currency of Ukraine: Hryvnia
ISO 4217: UAH
 Energy in Ukraine
 Energy policy of Ukraine
 Oil industry in Ukraine
 Health care in Ukraine
 Mining in Ukraine
 Ukraine Stock Exchange
 Tourism in Ukraine
 Transport in Ukraine
 Airports in Ukraine
 Rail transport in Ukraine
 Roads in Ukraine
 Water supply and sanitation in Ukraine

Education in Ukraine 

Education in Ukraine

Health in Ukraine 

Health in Ukraine

See also 

Outline of Europe
Lists of countries and territories
List of international rankings
Member state of the United Nations

References

External links 

 The President of Ukraine
 Government Portal of Ukraine
 The Parliament of Ukraine
 
 Ukraine. The World Factbook. Central Intelligence Agency.
 

Ukraine
 
Ukraine